Orthogonius emarginatus is a species of ground beetle in the subfamily Orthogoniinae. It was described by Tian & Deuve in 2007.

References

emarginatus
Beetles described in 2007